The Effects of Hurricane Isaac in Florida were severe local flooding in South Florida and tornadoes in the central and northern portions of the state in August 2012. Hurricane Isaac formed from a tropical wave while located east of the Lesser Antilles on August 21, 2012. The storm moved westward, crossed through the Leeward Islands, and entered the Caribbean Sea on August 22. Isaac initially struggled to intensify and defied predictions of it strengthening into a hurricane. The storm made its first landfall in Haiti as a midgrade tropical storm prior to making a second one in Cuba later that day. It remained somewhat disorganized while moving through the Straits of Florida and passed near the Florida Keys on August 27. The storm threatened to strike the Tampa Bay Area during the 2012 Republican National Convention and move ashore in the Florida Panhandle as a major hurricane. However, it continued northwestward and avoided landfall in the state. The storm finally became a hurricane late on August 28. Isaac made two landfalls in Louisiana on August 29, the first near the mouth of the Mississippi River and the other near Port Fourchon. The storm steadily weakened and eventually dissipated over Missouri on September 1.

Despite passing closest to the Florida Keys, impact was minimal, limited to tropical storm-force winds and light rainfall. The outer bands of Isaac produced heavy precipitation further north, especially in Palm Beach, St. Lucie and Indian River counties. In the former, the resultant flooding left numerous residents in Royal Palm Beach and Loxahatchee isolated. There was extensive street flooding, and water entered a few houses. Damage in Palm Beach County alone was nearly $71.6 million (2012 USD). Inland flooding was also reported in several other counties, though losses were generally minor. A tornado in Indian River County damaged 118 mobile homes and 15 single family homes. Further north in Central Florida and the Panhandle, the storm spawned four other tornadoes. Tides along the Gulf Coast of Florida caused erosion and coastal flooding in Bay, Collier, Franklin, Gulf, and Wakulla counties. Though winds caused little damage, around 113,000 customers were left without electricity in South Florida. The storm resulted in two indirect fatalities, both caused by vehicles driving on slick roads in Palm Beach and Okeechobee counties. Throughout the state, damage reached approximately $91.45 million.

Background

Hurricane Isaac originated from a tropical wave that moved off the western coast of Africa on August 17. Moving generally westward, the low-pressure area initially did not have a well-defined center until three days later. Convection associated with the system organized and intensified, and the tropical wave quickly strengthened into a tropical depression. In favorable conditions, the depression was upgraded to Tropical Storm Isaac by the National Hurricane Center (NHC) on August 21. Quickly accelerating westward due to a subtropical ridge located to the northwest, Isaac later moved past the Lesser Antilles between Guadeloupe and Dominica by August 23, where it caused numerous mudslides and power outages. Maintaining tropical storm intensity, Isaac later made its first landfall on the southern coast of Haiti early on August 25 as a result of southeast flow. There, the storm directly killed 24 people, worsening conditions still remaining after the 2010 Haiti earthquake.

Isaac began to curve northwestward due to its location between a large deep-layer low pressure area in the northwestern Caribbean Sea and a mid-tropospheric ridge over the western Atlantic. After briefly moving into the Gulf of Gonâve, the tropical storm made a second landfall near Cajobabo, Guantánamo, in Cuba at 1500 UTC later on August 25, where damages were comparatively less severe than in Haiti. The storm paralleled the northern coast of the island prior to making a close pass of Key West, Florida, where it caused minor flood damage across the Florida Keys and South Florida upon entry into the Gulf of Mexico. The threat of tropical cyclone impacts in Tampa forced the postponing of the 2012 Republican National Convention. In the gulf, the tropical storm curved to the northwest and attained hurricane strength on August 27 near the southern Louisiana coast. Another ridge of high pressure caused Isaac to move towards the west and slow down as it made two landfalls on the state. Once it moved inland, the hurricane weakened before dissipating over Missouri on September 1.

Preparations

At 2100 UTC on August 24, a tropical storm watch was issued for all of Florida south of the Jupiter Inlet on the east coast and south of Bonita Springs on the west coast; it also included Lake Okeechobee and the Florida Keys. Early on the next day, the tropical storm watch was upgraded to a warning, while the Florida Keys and the mainland from Ocean Reef to Bonita Springs were placed under a hurricane watch. Further north, a tropical storm watch was issued from the Jupiter Inlet to the Sebastian Inlet. Later on August 25, the hurricane watch was switched to a warning, while a separate hurricane watch was issued from Golden Beach southward. At 1500 UTC on August 25, the tropical storm warning was extended northward to Sebastian Inlet. In addition, a tropical storm watch was issued further north from Sebastian Inlet to Flagler Beach on the east coast and Bonita Springs to Tarpon Springs on the west coast. About six hours later, the tropical storm watch along the west coast of Florida was extended northward to the mouth of the Suwannee River on August 25. The tropical storm watch, which now stretched from Bonita Springs to Tarpon Springs, was extended to Indian Pass on August 26. Simultaneously, a hurricane watch was issued from the mouth of the Mississippi River in Louisiana to Indian Pass, Florida.

After Isaac crossed the Florida Keys on August 26, the hurricane warning was downgraded to a tropical storm warning, and the tropical storm watch from Sebastian Inlet to Flagler Beach was discontinued. Simultaneously, the hurricane watch on the Gulf Coast of the United States was upgraded to a hurricane warning along the portion from Morgan City, Louisiana, to Destin, Florida. Additionally, the tropical storm warning was discontinued from the mouth of the Suwannee River to Tarpon Springs. Early on August 27, the tropical storm warning on the east coast of Florida was discontinued for areas lying north of the Jupiter Inlet. Six hours later, the tropical storm warning on the east coast of Florida was lifted from the Jupiter Inlet southward to Ocean Reef, including Lake Okeechobee. At 1500 UTC, all of the remaining watches and warnings for South Florida were cancelled. On August 28, the tropical storm warning in the Florida Panhandle was discontinued for areas east of Destin. By 1500 UTC on August 29, all tropical storm and hurricane watches and warnings were no longer in effect for the state of Florida.

During the week of August 27, the 2012 Republican National Convention was held in Tampa, Florida. Isaac threatened to force the cancellation or postponement of the convention; there was also potential to move the event's location. According to the Republican National Convention spokesman James Davis, officials had been coordinating with the United States Secret Service, should the 50,000 politicians, delegates, and reporters require evacuation. The Republican National Convention was pushed to August 28, with the storms threatening the coast of Tampa. Chairman of the Republican National Convention Reince Priebus announced on August 25 that the convention would only convene for a short amount of time on August 27 and "immediately recess until Tuesday afternoon, August 28". At the same time, Governor of Florida Rick Scott announced he would not be attending the convention, together with Governor of Alabama Robert J. Bentley. On August 25, Governor Scott declared a state of emergency for the state of Florida ahead of Tropical Storm Isaac. Amtrak suspended the Silver Meteor and Silver Star train service from Orlando to Miami on Sunday, August 26. In Miami-Dade County, evacuations were ordered for residents living in mobile homes. Additionally, the bridges across the Port of Miami were closed during the height of Isaac. Orange juice prices increased due to the threat of the storm in Florida, which produces more than 75 percent of orange crops in the United States.

The Florida Division of Emergency Management was put into partial activation, and Florida Power & Light brought in at least 4,300 workers to help with expected power outages. Key West International Airport suspended all flights in preparation of Isaac, while all cruises and many theme parks were delayed. The United States Coast Guard activated hurricane condition "whiskey", restricting the transportation of watercraft until the storm passed. In South Florida, specifically in Monroe County, many schools were used as shelters. In Miami-Dade County, all public schools and universities – including Florida International University and the University of Miami – cancelled classes. While the airport in the county remained open, it cancelled hundreds of flights and delayed many others. As the storm passed, regular services became available once again. Across the remainder of the state, especially in coastal counties, most schools and government buildings were closed. In Escambia County, a mandatory evacuation was ordered for zones A, B, and C. Many shelters were opened for those who had nowhere to go, and all county schools were shut down. At Naval Air Station Pensacola, many planes were either evacuated from the base or placed into secure hangars. Farther east in Santa Rosa County, a mandatory evacuation was also ordered for zones A, B, and C, including all mobile home parks, campgrounds, low-lying areas, and RV parks. In Walton County, special needs and general shelters were opened to the public, and all schools and government offices were to be shut down throughout the duration of the storm. The Clyde B. Wells Bridge was also shut down in anticipation of tropical storm-force winds.

Impact

The storm impacted nearly all of Florida, despite not making landfall in the state. Due to the weak intensity and path offshore, damage was caused primarily by flooding, rather than winds. Persistent rainbands brought heavy precipitation to much of east-central and southeast Florida. The resultant flooding left entire neighborhoods isolated and caused damage to homes, businesses, and roads in Palm Beach County. Other areas, such as Broward, Indian River, Martin, Miami-Dade, and St. Lucie counties, were also impacted by flooding, albeit less severely.

Tides along the Gulf Coast of Florida caused erosion and coastal flooding in Bay, Collier, Franklin, Gulf, and Wakulla counties. Though winds caused little damage, around 113,000 customers were left without electricity in South Florida alone. Further north in Central Florida and the Panhandle, Isaac spawned five tornadoes, one each in Hillsborough, Holmes, Indian River, Jackson, and Osceola counties. All of them ranked as only F0 on the Fujita scale. The worst twister occurred in Indian River County, damaging 133 buildings, most of which were mobile homes. Throughout the state, two indirect fatalities were reported and losses reached approximately $91.54 million.

Southern Florida
Despite the Florida Keys being the closest to the path of the storm, effects there were minimal. Winds were stronger in Miami-Dade County, reaching  at the Atlantic Oceanographic and Meteorological Laboratory (AOML) headquarters in Virginia Key. Many trees and power lines were downed throughout the county, with an estimated 33,000 residences experiencing power outages. Tides reaching up to  caused major beach erosion and minor coastal flooding in Naples. In Goodland, water entered a few homes but was mainly confined to streets, yards, and marinas. Less than 2,000 people were left without electricity in Collier County. Damage within that county was estimated to have reached $6 million. Throughout southeastern Florida, 113,000 people were left without electricity.

Moderate to severe flooding occurred over parts of northern Broward County. In Lauderhill, canals overflowed their banks and streets were flooded for a few days. Additionally, a few homes sustained minor water damage. Water also entered a few homes and businesses in Tamarac. Standing water also forced the closure of a few on-ramps to the Sawgrass Expressway. Losses in Broward County reached $1 million.

Palm Beach County

The outer bands produced relatively strong winds in Palm Beach County. Additionally, winds in the area blew significant amounts of sand away, exposing rocks and creating  drops. Slightly further south, waves of  pounded the beaches of Jupiter, though only minimal beach erosion was reported. Nonetheless, hundreds of sea turtle nests were swept away, though 100 hatchlings were brought to the Loggerhead Marinelife Center in Juno Beach. Nearly all of the eastern half of Palm Beach County experienced at least  of precipitation.
 
Due to heavy rainfall, widespread flooding was reported, especially in the central and western portions of the county. Whole neighborhoods in The Acreage, Loxahatchee, Royal Palm Beach, and Wellington were left stranded for up to several days. In some areas, flooding was considered the worst since Hurricane Irene in 1999. At the post office in Loxahatchee, the parking lot was flooded, forcing the building to close for several days. A major washout was reported in West Palm Beach at the intersection of State Roads 80 and 882. Also in West Palm Beach, a road collapsed and fire rescue crews quickly closed the road. On State Road 704, a portion of it became inaccessible to low-clearance vehicles. A man died in West Palm Beach after driving through the storm and crashing into a concrete wall along Interstate 95. Several major and minor roads were also inundated by water in Wellington. Additionally, there was flooding at the intersections of Meadow Avenue and Greenview Shores Boulevard, and Indian Mound Road and South Shore Boulevard. Heavy rainfall left several leaking roofs at an apartment complex in Pahokee.

In the southern portion of Palm Beach County, flooding and wind damage was also reported. Residents reported an unconfirmed tornado in Lake Worth. It knocked over some trees and damage a shed and some roofs, as well as cause a few power outages. In Delray Beach, lightning struck a tree, causing part of it to fall through an awning, break a window, and slice into a house. Streets were littered with small branches and palm fronds in Boca Raton, while low-lying roads and swales were flooded with several inches of water. One small tree was uprooted across the street from City Hall. Initially, schools throughout the county were to remain open. However, in response to flooding, all Palm Beach County schools were closed on August 27 and August 28. Thereafter, all but eight county public schools – located in Loxahatchee and The Acreage – were opened. Damage estimates for Palm Beach County reached $71.59 million, $40 million of which was incurred to the Indian Trail Improvement District.

Central Florida

The most significant impacts occurred in the city of Okeechobee and adjacent areas, such as Taylor Creek. Overflowing creeks and canals caused major flood damage to 14 homes, while another 146 had minor water intrusion. Several roads were temporarily closed due to standing water. One indirect fatality occurred along State Road 78 in Okeechobee, after a 62‑year‑old man lost control of his vehicle and crashed. Winds were relatively light, with gusts between  along the northern shores of Lake Okeechobee. As a result, several roads in the county were temporarily impassable, while water entered one business complex in Palm City. Further north in St. Lucie County, rainfall amounts were similar. Standing water was reported on roads in Fort Pierce, Lakewood Park, Port St. Lucie, and White City.

The storm also produced heavy rainfall in Indian River County, with  reported in Vero Beach. This was the highest observed precipitation total in the state of Florida during Isaac. Throughout Indian River County, 27 homes and 2 single–family homes were flooded, while 20 roads were temporarily closed due to standing water. An EF0 tornado touched down in Vero Beach for about two minutes, damaging 118 mobile homes and 15 single family houses. According to Indian River County Emergency Management Coordinator Dale Justice, that tornado caused $850,000 in losses. At the Vero Beach Municipal Airport, sustained winds reached . The inundation was caused by Arbuckle Creek overflowing and washing a few inches of water on the road.

A damage survey conducted by the National Weather Service indicates that a tornado was spawned near St. Cloud in Osceola County. It destroyed an abandoned mobile home, leaving only a floor attachment to the frame. The tornado moved across a citrus grove, causing damage to trees and shrubs. Thereafter, it removed shingles and broke a window at one residence, while some fences nearby were toppled. Additionally, rainfall amounts ranging from  left several roads impassable. The Myakka River overflowed in Sarasota County, flooding the Ramblers Mobile Home Park. Water rose up to the doorsteps of several units, while parking lots and grassy areas were inundated by water. Due to its weaker and further westward track than initially anticipated, impact in Hillsborough County and the city of Tampa was minimal during the Republican National Convention. A waterspout moved onshore near Tampa, damaging 6 houses in addition to the fences and trees on those properties.

North Florida and Florida Panhandle

Although it passed further west and was weaker than anticipated, the outer bands and fringe of the storm produced light rainfall and two tornadoes in the Florida Panhandle. The first tornado in the region was spawned near Greenwood in Jackson County, but caused no damage. The other tornado touched down near Graceville in Holmes County and ripped off the front porch of a mobile home and downed numerous trees. Rainfall was reported for a 3-day period in Flagler County from August 26 to August 28. Some minor flooding occurred in parking lots. Gusty winds of  felled isolated trees in the western part of the county. A few trees were also blown down in Alachua County, one of which fell onto Main Street in Gainesville. Losses in Escambia and Santa Rosa Counties amounted to $10.4 million and $1.2 million respectively.

Some coastal flooding occurred across portions of Bay, Franklin, Gulf, and Wakulla counties due to storm surge. At St. George Island State Park, waves pushed pass the dune line and flooded parking areas. Losses were estimated at $500,000. The depth of inundation along 7th Avenue in Panama City ranged from a few inches to about one foot, while other roads in Lynn Haven and West Bay were also flooded. Tides along the coast of Gulf County flooded a road in Indian Pass and the access road to St. Joseph Peninsula State Park, causing closure of the park. The area experienced tidal flooding only about two months earlier during Tropical Storm Debby. One vacant home experienced minor water intrusion around the time of highest tide in Shell Point.

Aftermath
Following the storm, Governor of Florida Rick Scott attended a briefing at the South Florida Water Management District before boarding a helicopter to tour flooded areas of Palm Beach County. Scott said, "We've got to take care of everybody's needs but we've got to get our state back to work," and also encouraged tourists to return to the state, especially in Key West, where hotel owners were considering cancelling reservations for Labor Day. A Florida state fund known as Neighbors to the Rescue – with the purpose of distributing money to help recovery efforts for victims of Isaac – was activated by the governor. The area already qualified for small business loans due to a state of emergency and after the Federal Emergency Management Agency (FEMA) reviewed damage assessments, President of the United States Barack Obama considered a disaster declaration. Initially, FEMA denied a disaster declaration. In response, Governor Scott mailed a letter of appeal to FEMA Administrator Craig Fugate. The appeal was accepted, and on October 18, 2012, President Obama issued a disaster declaration for Bay, Collier, Escambia, Franklin, Gulf, Martin, Monroe, Okaloosa, Palm Beach, St. Lucie, and Santa Rosa counties.

See also
Effects of Hurricane Isaac in Louisiana
Tropical Storm Debby (2012)
Tropical Storm Fay (2008)

References

External links

WPTV photo archive
Palm Beach Post photo archive

Issac
2012 in Florida
Hurricanes in Florida
Issac in Florida
Isaac Florida